Bahoran Lal Maurya is an Indian politician and a member of 17th Legislative Assembly of Bareilly of Uttar Pradesh State of India. He represents the Bhojipura constituency of Uttar Pradesh and is a member of the Bharatiya Janata Party.

Political career
Maurya has been a member of the 17th Legislative Assembly of Uttar Pradesh. Since 2017, he has represented the Bhojipura constituency and is a member of the BJP.

Posts held

See also
Uttar Pradesh Legislative Assembly

References

Uttar Pradesh MLAs 2017–2022
Bharatiya Janata Party politicians from Uttar Pradesh
Living people
Year of birth missing (living people)